Naina Peak is the highest hill in Nainital district and the southern part of Uttarakhand State in India. 

The trail to the peak passes through the Nanda Devi Himalayan bird conservation reserve.

References

Hills of Uttarakhand
Geography of Uttarakhand